The Greens (VEC or LV) was a centre-left to left-wing green-ecologist political party in France. The Greens had been in existence since 1984, but their spiritual roots could be traced as far back as René Dumont's candidacy for the presidency in 1974. On 13 November 2010, The Greens merged with Europe Ecology to become Europe Ecology – The Greens.

History

Early years
Since 1974, the environmentalist movement has been a permanent feature of the French political scene, contesting every election: municipal, national & European.

In the years following Dumont's challenge for the presidency, and prior to the formal confirmation of les Verts as political party, environmentalists contested elections under such banners as Ecology 78, Ecology Europe and Ecology Today. When, in 1982, the Ecologist Party merged with the Ecologist Confederation, les Verts were born. Under the ideological guidance of Antoine Waechter, the party in 1986 signalled a break with the traditional divide in French politics, declaring that environmental politics could not be "married" to either the left or the right (which gave rise to its famous slogan "ni droite, ni gauche" – "neither right, nor left"). Antoine Waechter ran in the 1988 presidential elections, capturing 1,150,000 ballots (or 3.8%) in the first round of voting. But the major breakthrough came the following year when – again under the leadership of Waechter – the Greens polled 10.6% in the European parliamentary elections.

However, the party faced with another ecologist party: Ecology Generation led by Brice Lalonde, environment minister of President François Mitterrand and allied with the Socialist Party (PS). In this, if the ecologist parties benefited from the electoral decline of the PS in the beginning of the 1990s, the Greens competed for the leadership of the French ecologist movement. In the 1992 regional elections, the Greens obtained 6.8% of votes and the presidency of Nord-Pas-de-Calais region. The next year, it scored 4.1% in the legislative election while all of the ecologist votes represented 11%. But, without political allies in the second round, they failed to gain a parliamentary seat.

Participation in government
Waechter's influence was called into question in 1994 when the Greens decided to break with his policy of non-alignment, instead deciding to adopt a markedly left-wing stance. The move prompted Waechter to leave the Greens. He went on to found the Independent Ecological Movement. In the following presidential election of 1995, Dominique Voynet polled a modest 3.8% but, in due to the marginalisation of Ecology Generation, the Greens captured the leadership into the family of the French political ecology.

Component of Plural Left coalition, the Greens obtained for the first time a parliamentary representation in 1997. Dominique Voynet was to lead the party into government for the first time, joining Lionel Jospin's Socialist Party (PS) and the Communist Party (PCF). Voynet was rewarded with the cabinet position of Minister for the Environment and Regional Planning, before being replaced by Yves Cochet in 2001.

Daniel Cohn-Bendit (or "Danny the Red"), a leader of the 1968 student uprising, spearheaded the party's 1999 European campaign, obtaining 9.7% of votes cast, enough to return seven deputies to Strasbourg.

Alain Lipietz was first selected to represent the Greens in the 2002 presidential elections but his public outings proved awkward and he was soon replaced by Noël Mamère who had initially lost the primary elections. Mamère's 5.25% represents the strongest Green challenge for the presidency to date. However, the legislative elections were a major disappointment: with just 4.51% of votes cast nationally, the Greens’ representation fell from six to just three deputies (out of a total of 577) in the National Assembly.

The Greens today
Following the return to opposition benches in 2002, Gilles Lemaire assumed the position of national secretary. His tenure is marked by a period of internal strife in the party. Lemaire was in turn replaced by Yann Wehrling, who seemingly united a majority of the membership under a text outlining the future direction that the party hoped to pursue. He was succeeded by Cécile Duflot in 2006, who was the party's youngest National Secretary at the age of 31. She announced her resignation in May 2012 after being appointed to the new cabinet appointed by President François Hollande.

Les Verts had six MEPs elected in the 2004 European Election with 8.43% of the vote.

In the hugely divisive 2005 referendum on the European Constitution, the Greens campaigned for a Yes vote.

In the 2007 French presidential election, les Verts nominated Dominique Voynet. Her low score of 1.57% in the first round was the party's worst electoral result, and the French ecologist's worst showing since René Dumont in the 1974. The party refused an electoral deal with the Socialists for the June legislative election. However, the three Green incumbents, Noël Mamère, Yves Cochet, and Martine Billard had no PS opposition in their respective constituencies. While the Green's vote share was down from 2002, it won a fourth seat in Nantes where François de Rugy defeated a conservative UMP incumbent. The Greens now had four seats in the Assembly and sat with the PCF in the Democratic and Republican Left group.

In the 2009 European Parliament election, the party was an integral part of the Europe Écologie coalition, led by Daniel Cohn-Bendit, which gained 8 seats for a total of 14 on a 16.3% of the vote. Since November 2010, it merged with the coalition to become Europe Ecology – The Greens.

The Skandrani Affair
One of the party's co-founders, Ginette Skandrani, had long attracted criticism due to her involvement with Holocaust deniers.
The Stephen Roth Institute criticized the Green Party in 2004, calling its record "tainted by abortive attempts to expel from within its ranks notorious anti-Jewish activist Ginette Skandrani herself ethnically Jewish who has close contacts with Holocaust deniers."

Other critics, such as Roger Cukierman of the Representative Council of French Jewish Institutions did not attack the party as a whole, but rather its anti-Zionist wing, claiming that it promoted a "brown-green alliance".

In June 2005, the Greens voted to permanently expel Skandrani. Among the reasons for her definitive expulsion were her participation in the holocaust-denial website AAARGH (Association des anciens amateurs de récits de guerres et d'holocaustes). Patrick Farbiaz, a Green leader involved in her expulsion, argued that "although she has not written [anti-Semitic texts] herself, she looks like a kingpen of holocaust deniers and avowed antisemites".

The party had previously expelled another co-founder (in 1991), Jean Brière, for signing a text addressing the alleged "war-causing role" of Israel and "the zionist lobby in the Gulf War."

Call to lift sanctions against Cypriot Turks

Green MEP Helene Flautre has attracted controversy by calling for the lifting of sanctions against Turkish Cypriots imposed by the United Nations.

Youth wing
The youth branch of the Greens, founded in Strasbourg in 2001, is called Les Jeunes Verts – la Souris verte (Young Greens – the Green mouse). It has been part of the Federation of Young European Greens since 2006.

Factions

Most internal divisions within the party concern the party's political position (neither right nor left, or left-wing) and electoral strategy (alliance with the PS or the far-left parties).

Neo-Waechterians (environmentalists, social liberals, centrists): Followers of former Green leader Antoine Waechter, a large part has joined the Independent Ecological Movement or, more recently, the MoDem (Jean-Luc Bennahmias, Yann Wehrling)
Green left (eco-socialists, democratic socialists, Maoists): Including members such as Jean Desessard, Yves Contassot and, until recently, Martine Billard

The party's final leadership, led by Cécile Duflot, and including Dominique Voynet, Yves Cochet and Noël Mamère were positioned between the two aforementioned factions.

Elected officials

Deputies: Yves Cochet, Noël Mamère, François de Rugy (GDR Group). Martine Billard, elected as a Green in 2007 joined the Left Party in July 2009.
Senators: Marie-Christine Blandin, Alima Boumediene-Thiery, Jean Desessard, Jacques Muller, Dominique Voynet (Socialist Group).
MEPs: Malika Benarab-Attou, Pascal Canfin, Daniel Cohn-Bendit, Karima Delli, Hélène Flautre, Catherine Grèze, Nicole Kiil-Nielsen, Michèle Rivasi (6 of the 14 MEPs from Europe Écologie are not members of the party).

The Greens held 41 town halls, the largest city being Montreuil (Seine-Saint-Denis). Other cities held by the Greens include Wattwiller, Bègles and Mèze. The party also claims 168 regional councillors and 14 general councillors (plus 9 Parisian councillors).

Popular support and electoral record

The Greens were strong electorally in urban areas, specifically in the Greater Paris area, Brittany and western France, parts of the Rhône-Alpes region and Alsace. In the 2009 European elections, the Greens won their best result outside of Corsica, where their result was due to the support of the Party of the Corsican Nation (PNC), in the city of Paris (27.41%), Haute-Savoie (20.26%), Drôme (21.75%), Isère (21.64%), Hauts-de-Seine (20.74%), Ille-et-Vilaine (20.59%), and Loire-Atlantique (20.16%). It also did very well in large, wealthy urban centres such as Rennes or Grenoble. It does more poorly in rural areas, notably areas where its rival, CPNT, is strong. It also did poorly in industrial or poorer urban areas; for example it won only 9.33% in the Pas-de-Calais, a department formerly dominated by coal mining, in 2009.

Presidential

Legislative

European Parliament

See also

European Federation of Green Parties
List of environmental organizations

References

External links
 Official site
 Profile from the European Green Party

Defunct green political parties
Green political parties in France
Left-wing parties in France
Political parties established in 1982
Political parties disestablished in 2010
European Green Party
Political parties of the French Fifth Republic
1982 establishments in France